Douglas Robert Zachariah Brien (born November 24, 1970) is a former American football placekicker and American businessman. He played twelve seasons in the National Football League (NFL) for seven teams: San Francisco, New Orleans, Indianapolis, Tampa Bay, Minnesota, New York Jets, and Chicago. Brien was picked in the third round of the 1994 NFL Draft (85th overall) by San Francisco out of the University of California, Berkeley. After retiring from the NFL, Brien co-founded the real estate investment firms Waypoint Homes and Mynd.

High school career

Brien attended De La Salle High School in Concord, California, where he was a placekicker for the Spartans' football team his senior year.

College career

At California, he was a member of the teams that won the Citrus Bowl in 1991 and the Alamo Bowl in 1993.  Off the field, he was a member of the Sigma Alpha Epsilon fraternity.

Professional career
Brien was drafted in the 3rd round (85th overall) in the 1994 NFL draft.  He was the only kicker to be taken during the draft and moved across the bay to join the San Francisco 49ers.  Brien struggled during his rookie year, converting 15 of 20 field goals (20th of 28 qualified kickers) and 60 of 62 PATs (19th of 24 qualified kickers) for the 49ers.  The 49ers, led by Steve Young, went on to win Super Bowl XXIX over the San Diego Chargers by a score of 49–26, a game in which Brien missed his only field goal attempt, a 47-yard try before halftime.  Brien nonetheless set the record for most PATs during a single postseason with 17 (on 18 attempts) en route to earning a Super Bowl ring that season.  Brien also had a fumble recovery during the NFC Championship game.

The following year, Brien made only 58% of his field goals for San Francisco, and was cut after missing a potential game-winning field goal against the Indianapolis Colts. He signed a few weeks later with the New Orleans Saints. Brien went on to play a total of 12 seasons in the NFL for 7 different organizations including 6 seasons with the Saints.  He was elected a team captain as well as the NFLPA player rep for the Saints.  Over the course of his career, Brien was regarded as one of the most reliable kickers in the league.  One huge exception to this was during the 2004 Divisional Playoff game in Pittsburgh against the Steelers.  Brien missed two 4th-quarter field goals from 47 and 43 yards which would have won the game for the New York Jets.  At the time of his retirement, he was one of the 10 most accurate field goal kickers of all time, and currently ranks 60th. During his career, Brien converted 80.2% of field goals and 98% of PATs.  Brien accounted for 915 points over his 12-year career and has a career long make from 56 yards. He was also an alternate to the Pro Bowl on two occasions.

References

External links
kicking.com - Doug Brien
NFL.com - Doug Brien

1970 births
Living people
People from Bloomfield, New Jersey
American football placekickers
California Golden Bears football players
San Francisco 49ers players
Indianapolis Colts players
New Orleans Saints players
Tampa Bay Buccaneers players
Minnesota Vikings players
New York Jets players
Chicago Bears players
De La Salle High School (Concord, California) alumni
Players of American football from New Jersey